Potato kugel is a potato-based kugel of Ashkenazi Jewish origin, made with grated or pureed potatoes, onions, eggs, flour or matzo meal, oil, salt and pepper.

Overview
It is commonly served for Shabbat and other Jewish holidays. It is more similar to a latke than it is to a noodle kugel, as there are sweet variations of noodle kugel but all potato kugel are always savory dishes. Potato kugel is typically made in a large casserole dish, although it is also sometimes prepared in individual ramekins. Potato kugel can be made with grated potatoes, which gives it a crispier texture, or it can be made with potatoes puréed in a food processor, creating a "pudding-like consistency" according to Jewish chef Jamie Geller.

Some modern cooks add a small amount of baking powder. The powder's alkaline chemistry breaks down the potatoes and produces a smoother texture while promoting browning.

References

See also

Latkes
Noodle kugel

Ashkenazi Jewish cuisine
Shabbat food
Potato dishes
Casserole dishes
Kugels